Anjan Choudhury (25 November 1944 – 21 February 2007) was an Indian film director, writer, and screenplay writer who worked in the Bengali cinema of West Bengal. He was survived by his wife Jaysree Choudhury and two daughters, namely Chumki Chowdhury (elder) and Rina Choudhury, and son. His elder son in law is named Sajal. His son Sandip Choudhury was a T.V. serial and film director. His son Sandip had died on 03rd January 2023. His daughter in law Bidisha Choudhury is also a film actress.

Film Career
He was started his journey as journalist and Writer for magazine.

Partial filmography

 Shatru 1984
 Guru Dakshina 1987
 Bidrohi 1987
 Boro Bou 1997
 Mejo Bou 1995
 Choto Bou 1988
 Anjali (1988 film)     1988
 Hirak Jayanti  1990
 Mahajan (film) 1990
 Bidhilipi  1991
 Indrajit   1992
 Maya Mamata 1993
 Abbajan   1994
 Naach Nagini Naach Re 1996
 Mukhyamantri     1996
 Jibon Niye Khela  1999
 Bangali Babu 2002
 Choudhuri Paribaar 1995
 Puja 1998
 Pratibaad 2000
 Devta
 Mahan
 Indrjeet
 Nabab

Awards 
 Kalakar Awards

References

External links

Film directors from Kolkata
Bengali film directors
1944 births
2007 deaths
Kalakar Awards winners
20th-century Indian film directors